The following list is of important municipalities in the Galicia, an autonomous community of Spain:

Provincial lists 
The following links are to lists which are more detailed province-specific, and all municipalities in a given province are ranked by population.

 List of municipalities in A Coruña 
 List of municipalities in Lugo
 List of municipalities in Ourense 
 List of municipalities in Pontevedra

By population

See also 

 Comarcas of Galicia

References